Zacopride is a potent antagonist at the 5-HT3 receptor and an agonist at the 5-HT4 receptor. It has anxiolytic and nootropic effects in animal models, with the (R)-(+)-enantiomer being the more active form. It also has antiemetic and pro-respiratory effects, both reducing sleep apnea and reversing opioid-induced respiratory depression in animal studies. Early animal trials have also revealed that administration of zacopride can reduce preference for and consumption of ethanol.

Zacopride was found to significantly increase aldosterone levels in human subjects for 180 minutes at a dose of 400 micrograms.  It is thought to do this by stimulating the 5-HT4 receptors on the adrenal glands.  Zacopride also stimulated aldosterone secretion when applied to human adrenal glands in vitro.  No significant changes were observed in renin, ACTH, or cortisol levels.

Zacopride has been tested in clinical trials for the treatment of schizophrenia, but was found unsuccessful.

References 

5-HT3 antagonists
Anilines
Benzamides
Chloroarenes
Phenol ethers
Quinuclidines
Respiratory agents
Serotonin receptor agonists